Vugdalić is a Bosnian surname. Notable people with the surname include:

Muamer Vugdalič (born 1977), Slovenian footballer and manager
Sabahudin Vugdalić (born 1953), Bosnian footballer and sports journalist

Bosnian surnames